Westville may refer to:

in Canada
 Westville, Nova Scotia

in South Africa
 Westville, KwaZulu-Natal

in the United Kingdom
 Westville, Nottinghamshire
 Westville, Lincolnshire

in the United States
 Westville, California, an unincorporated community in Placer County
 Westville (New Haven), Connecticut, a neighborhood 
 Westville, Florida, a town in Holmes County
 Westville (Georgia), an open-air museum town in the city of Columbus
 Westville, Illinois, a village in Vermilion County
 Westville, Indiana, a town in LaPorte County
 Westville, Monroe County, Mississippi, a village
 Westville, Simpson County, Mississippi, a ghost town
 Westville, Missouri, an unincorporated community
 Westville, New Jersey, a borough in Gloucester County
 Westville, New York, a town in Franklin County
 Westville, Oklahoma, a town in Adair County
 Westville, Pennsylvania, an unincorporated community
 Westville, South Carolina, an unincorporated community

See also
 New Westville, Ohio